OJSC "SAT Airlines — Sakhalinskie Aviatrassy", commonly known as SAT Airlines, was an airline based in Sakhalin, Russia. It provided scheduled regional air services in Russia's Far East and to destinations in China, South Korea and Japan. Other services included charter flights, search and rescue operations, firefighting and aerial patrols. Its main base was Yuzhno-Sakhalinsk Airport.

The airline was amalgamated with Vladivostok Air to form new carrier Aurora in October 2013, with the new company retaining the airline designator codes of SAT Airlines.

History 

The Joint Stock Company, Sakhalinskie Aviatrassy — SAT Airlines was established as a result of the reorganisation of the Sakhalin United Detachment. It was established and started operations on 20 April 1992. Its sole owner was the Government of the Russian Federation. It employed 574 staff.

Destinations 
 

In October 2013, SAT Airlines operated flights to the following destinations:

China
 Harbin - Harbin Taiping International Airport
 Beijing - Beijing Capital International Airport
Japan
 Sapporo - New Chitose Airport
Russia
 Iturup Island - Burevestnik Airport
 Blagoveshchensk - Ignatyevo Airport
 Khabarovsk - Khabarovsk Novy Airport Focus City
 Petropavlovsk-Kamchatsky - Petropavlovsk-Kamchatsky Airport
 Okha - Okha Airport
 Vladivostok - Vladivostok International Airport
 Yuzhno-Kurilsk - Yuzhno-Kurilsk Airport
 Yuzhno-Sakhalinsk - Yuzhno-Sakhalinsk Airport Hub
South Korea
 Seoul - Incheon International Airport

Fleet 

In October 2013, SAT Airlines' fleet consisted of the following aircraft:

See also

Aurora (airline)
Defunct airlines of Russia

References

External links 

Official website 
Official website 
SAT Airlines aircraft
Initial version of the Sakhalin Air Transport Passenger Safety Information 

Defunct airlines of Russia

Companies based in Yuzhno-Sakhalinsk
Former Aeroflot divisions
Airlines established in 1992
Airlines disestablished in 2013